Tobin may refer to:

Name
Tobin (surname)
Tobin (given name)

Places in the United States
 Tobin, California
 Tobin Bridge, near Boston, Massachusetts
 Tobin Range, a mountain range in Nevada
 Tobin Township, Perry County, Indiana
 Tobin, Wisconsin
 Breitmeyer-Tobin Building, in Detroit, Michigan

Fictional characters
 Princess Tobin, a character in Melanie Rawn's Dragon Prince series of fantasy novels
 Prince Tobin, the main character in The Bone Doll's Twin by Lynn Flewelling
 Mitch Tobin, protagonist of five mystery novels by Donald Westlake
 Tobin, a supporting character in the Fire Emblem franchise, who appears in Fire Emblem: Gaiden and its remake, Fire Emblem Echoes: Shadows of Valentia.
 Beef Tobin and his kids from the animated sitcom, The Great North
 A character from the TV series The Walking Dead

Other uses
 Tobin tax, a currency exchange tax first proposed by James Tobin
 Tobin's q, an economic measure developed by James Tobin

See also

 Tobing, a surname
Toby